Cannabis in Haiti is illegal with severe punishments for the production, sale, and possession of marijuana for medicinal or recreational purposes.

According to the World Drug Report 2011, 1.4% of the population use cannabis at least once per year.

References

Haiti
Drugs in Haiti
Haiti
Haiti